Svetlana Kuznetsova (born 10 January 1965) is a Russian former basketball player who competed in the 1996 Summer Olympics.

References

1965 births
Living people
Russian women's basketball players
Olympic basketball players of Russia
Basketball players at the 1996 Summer Olympics
Soviet women's basketball players